March Fires is the fourth studio album by Western Australian alternative rock band Birds of Tokyo. It was released on 1 March 2013 in Australia, North American and Europe through EMI. It is the band's second major-label studio album release after 2010's Birds of Tokyo under EMI. It is also the first album by the band not to feature founding member Anthony Jackson, after he had left the band in 2011. His replacement, Ian Berney, makes his debut appearance on the album as the band's new bassist.

March Fires released to positive reviews, and the album became the band's first number-one album on the ARIA Albums Chart. It also marked the band's international album chart debut, reaching number 26 on the New Zealand album chart.

Recording
Birds of Tokyo entered the studio to record their fourth studio album in February 2012. The album was primarily recorded in Los Angeles, California. The band recorded over a six-month period lasting until July. Kingsize Studio and The Hobby Shop in Eagle Rock, along with the Sound Factory and Oceanway Studios in Hollywood hosted these sessions. A final week-long session was conducted in October 2012 at The Hoop Hut in Sydney, before the album officially ceased recording later that month. The album is notably the first album to feature bassist Ian Berney, after founding member and previous bassist Anthony Jackson left the band due to spiritual reasons. March Fires is the first ever material released by the band not to be recorded with Jackson.

Packaging
The artwork for March Fires and its singles were created by Australian graphic designer, art director, and album artist Leif Podhajsky. Podhajsky's work explores themes of connectedness, love, fear, magic, the relevance of nature and the psychedelic or altered experience, and uses techniques such as pattern, recursion, balance, symmetry and repetition. By utilizing these subjects he attempts to "coerce the viewer into a realignment with themselves and their surroundings". Podhajsky's work has been described as "striking abstractions of nature – mirrored vistas, engulfing waves, rippling, melting cosmic landscapes". He had previously worked with other bands over the past few years to produce album artwork such as The Vines' 2011 album, Future Primitive and Tame Impala's albums Innerspeaker and Lonerism.

Promotion

Singles
"This Fire" was released as the lead single from March Fires on 5 October 2012. An accompanying extended play featuring album track "Boy" and B-side "Glowing in the Streets", along with a March Fires cut entitled "The Lake", was also released the same day. The music video was released the previous day on 4 October 2012.

"Lanterns" was released as the second single from the album on 14 January 2013. The single has since become the band's most successful single, peaking at number three on the Australian singles chart, the band's first top ten single. It was also notably number one on the ARIA Australian artist singles chart for a total of nine weeks. Additionally, it was also certified platinum, having sold over 70,000 copies of the single in Australia. The music video for the single debuted on 17 January 2013 and was shot in Sydney.

"When the Night Falls Quiet" was solicited to Australian Contemporary hit radio on 21 April 2013 as the third single from March Fires. The music video for the single debuted on the same day.

Critical reception

March Fires received generally positive reviews. Sean Palmer of The Sydney Morning Herald gave the album a four-star review, stating that "March Fires is a gem and channels emotion but never to the point of nausea, leaving you feeling comfortable in the pleasant tones of a band that know what they are doing." He noted the stylistic similarities of the album to the band's previous work and wrote "There is nothing here to shock or bewilder unless you are expecting Birds of Tokyo to return to their alt-rock origins with a hardened edge. If that's the case, you will be in for a jolt of disappointment, as beneath Kenny's words there is an astounding sense of positivity – as though one can climb that mountain, fix that bridge or restore faith." Simon Collins of The West Australian gave the album three stars, writing "Synth-laden mid-album tracks "The Others" and "White Leaves" briefly revive listeners, before they are plunged into a downbeat run home to "Hounds"."

Rob Lyon of Rip It Up wrote "While this album has proved a popular move into a different direction for frontman Ian Kenny and his Birds, I hope they don’t completely abandon their rock roots." in response to the light departure from the band's previous works. He praised the album as a singular piece writing that "From start to end the album is a solid listening experience, offering more with every additional spin. The strength of March Fires is its consistency and how well it all hangs together, with nothing appearing out of place or disappointing. Some may focus on how much the songs sound the same, but for me this one is about taking in the whole experience rather than selected moments."

Tom Noyse of The Music gave the album a positive review, writing "This newfound experimentation from Birds of Tokyo is fully apparent and it hits hard. The production is quite immaculate and is near the best they have yet created. March Fires is absolutely brilliant." Like other reviewers, he also noted of the band's musical evolution and light departure from their previous works; "Progression is inevitable. To evolve in music, you need to keep ideas fresh and move forward. This is truly evident in the fourth album by Perth-bred alternative rockers, Birds of Tokyo.". Nick Linde of Tom Magazine also gave the album a positive review, and also touched upon the difference of sound March Fires presented, writing "The new album from West Australian band Birds of Tokyo has a little bit of old and a little bit of new." He took note – "March Fires delivers a strong anthemic feel, coupled with the sound from the band that has taken off over the last few years."

Track listing
All songs written and composed by Ian Berney, Ian Kenny, Glenn Sarangapany, Adam Spark and Adam Weston.

Personnel
Adapted from the March Fires liner notes.

Birds of Tokyo
 Ian Kenny – vocals, lyrics
 Adam Spark – guitars, keyboards, vocals
 Ian "White Goods" Berney – bass guitar
 Glenn Sarangapany – keyboards, synthesisers, vocals
 Adam Weston – drums, percussion

Other personnel
 Dave Cooley – producer 
 Doug Boehm – engineer
 Hugo Nicholson – engineer
 Kristian Riley – additional engineer and editing
 Andrew Lynch – additional engineer
 Jared Hirshland – additional engineering and editing
 Chris Claypool – mix assistant
 Bryan Hall – guitar tech
 Magic – "good studio vibes"
 Leif Podhajsky – design and artwork
 Kane Hibberd – band photography

Charts and certifications

Weekly charts

Year-end charts

Certifications

Accolades

Release history

References

2013 albums
Birds of Tokyo albums
EMI Records albums